The Hawaii Department of Human Services is a state agency of Hawaii, headquartered in Honolulu CDP, City and County of Honolulu on the island of Oahu.

Divisions

Benefit, Employment and Support Service Division

Office of Youth Services
The Office of Youth Services (OYS) operates juvenile correctional services. The Hawaii Youth Correctional Facility (HYCF) is the agency's sole long-term confinement center of delinquent youth. It is located on the island of Oahu in Maunawili, City and County of Honolulu, near Kailua. The Project Kealahou partners with the HYCF to provide services for the girls in the facility.

References

External links

 Hawaii Department of Human Services

State agencies of Hawaii
Penal system in Hawaii
Juvenile detention centers in the United States
State corrections departments of the United States